Novosibirsk State Medical University (NSMU) is a medical university in Novosibirsk, Russia for training qualified doctors.

It was organized in 1935 when the medical faculty was opened. Until 1999 it was known as the Novosibirsk medical institute. From 1999 to 2005 it is the Novosibirsk state medical academy. In 2005 it was renamed Novosibirsk State Medical University. From 1996 to 2007 the institute was headed by Prof. A. V. Efremov. The university's rector from February 21, 2008, is Prof. Marinkin I.O.

At NSMU the following institutes and centers function:

 the medical advisory center
 institute of cosmetology
 institute of internal medicine 
 advice of independent medical experts 
 the certified center 
 the central certifying commission in SFO 
 the international center
 the district center of protection of motherhood and the childhood 
 a sports camp
 publishing house Sibmedizdat ("Сибмедиздат")
 a video studio Avitsenna ("Авиценна")
 others

Also, a newspaper and "Magazine of clinical and experimental medicine" is issued.

Faculties
 Medical faculty
 Pediatric faculty
 Stomatologic faculty
 Pharmaceutical faculty
 Faculty of precollege preparations of professional training
 Faculty of the maximum sisterly formation
 Faculty of social work
 Faculty of economy and management in public health services
 Faculty of clinical psychology
 Ecological faculty
 Faculty of improvement of professional skill qualification

External links
 Official site of NSMU (English version)

 
1935 establishments in Russia
Educational institutions established in 1935
Universities in Novosibirsk Oblast
Medical schools in Russia